Chinese Crossing, on Noskes Lane, near Yerong Creek, New South Wales, is a stone dam and causeway built in the 1880s by Chinese migrants. It was heritage listed by the Lockhart Shire Council in September 1995.

References

Further reading

Lockhart Shire
New South Wales Heritage Database